City Hall is the headquarters of a city or town's administration.

City Hall may also refer to:

Locations

Netherlands

 City Hall (Delft)
 City Hall, Dordrecht
 City Hall, Groningen
 City Hall (Haarlem)
 City Hall, Kampen
 City Hall, Weesp

United Kingdom
 City Hall (Bradford), England
 City Hall, Bristol, England
 City Hall, London (disambiguation)
 City Hall, London (Southwark), headquarters of the Greater London Authority between 2000 and 2021
 City Hall, London (Newham), headquarters of the Greater London Authority starting January 2022
 City Hall, Norwich, England
 City Hall, Sunderland, England
 City Hall, Cardiff, Wales
 Newcastle City Hall, a music venue in Newcastle upon Tyne, England

United States

 City Hall (Osceola, Arkansas), listed on the NRHP in Arkansas
 Alameda City Hall, listed on the NRHP in Alameda County, California
 Old City Hall (Berkeley, California)), listed on the NRHP in Alameda County, California
 City Hall (Hayward), California
 City Hall (Los Angeles), California
 Oakland City Hall, listed on the NRHP in Alameda County, California
City Hall (Leadville, Colorado), in National Historic Landmark Leadville Historic District
 City Hall (Atlanta), Georgia
 City Hall (Macon, Georgia)
 City Hall (Honolulu), Hawaii
 City Hall (Chicago), Illinois
 City Hall (Muncie, Indiana), listed on the NRHP in Indiana
 City Hall (Mount Pleasant, Iowa), listed on the NRHP in Iowa
 City Hall (Somerset, Kentucky), listed on the NRHP in Pulaski County, Kentucky
 City Hall (Baltimore), Maryland
 City Hall (Cumberland, Maryland), listed on the NRHP in Maryland
 City Hall (Boston), Massachusetts
 City Hall (Cambridge, Massachusetts)
 City Hall (Chicopee, Massachusetts), listed on the NRHP in Massachusetts
 City Hall (Fall River, Massachusetts)
 City Hall (Salem, Massachusetts), listed on the NRHP in Massachusetts
 City Hall (Bay City, Michigan), listed on the NRHP in Michigan
 City Hall (Detroit), Michigan
 City Hall (Cloquet), Minnesota
 Jackson City Hall, listed on the NRHP in Jackson, Mississippi
 City Hall (Columbia, Missouri)
 City Hall (Forest City, Missouri), listed on the NRHP in Missouri
 City Hall (Kansas City), Missouri
 City Hall (St. Louis), Missouri
 City Hall (University City, Missouri), listed on the NRHP in Missouri
 City Hall (Anaconda, Montana), listed on the NRHP in Montana
 City Hall (Lincoln, Nebraska), listed on the NRHP in Nebraska
 City Hall (Las Vegas), Nevada
 City Hall (Manchester, New Hampshire)
 City Hall (Albany), New York
 City Hall (Buffalo), New York
 City Hall (Manhattan), listed on the NRHP in New York
 City Hall (Plattsburgh, New York), listed on the NRHP in New York
 City Hall (Cincinnati), Ohio
 City Hall (Columbus, Ohio)
 City Hall (East Liverpool, Ohio), listed on the NRHP in Ohio
 City Hall (Pawhuska, Oklahoma), listed on the NRHP in Oklahoma
 Philadelphia City Hall, Pennsylvania
 City Hall (Reading, Pennsylvania), listed on the NRHP in Pennsylvania
 City Hall (Williamsport, Pennsylvania)
 City Hall (Dallas), Texas
 City Hall (Galveston, Texas), listed on the NRHP in Galveston County, Texas
 City Hall (Houston), Texas
 Old City Hall (Richmond, Virginia), listed on the NRHP in Richmond, Virginia
 City Hall (Port Townsend, Washington), listed on the NRHP in Jefferson County, Washington
 City Hall (Washington, D. C.), listed on the NRHP in Washington, D.C.
 City Hall (Eau Claire, Wisconsin), listed on the NRHP in Eau Claire County, Wisconsin
 City Hall (Rock Springs, Wyoming), listed on the NRHP in Wyoming

Elsewhere

 City Hall (Oranjestad), Aruba
 City Hall (Edmonton), Canada
 City Hall (Toronto), Canada
 City hall (Hong Kong)
 City Hall, Helsinki, Finland
 City Hall (Kecskemét), Hungary
 City Hall, Cork, Ireland
 City Hall, Dublin, Ireland
 City Hall, Penang, Malaysia 
 City Hall, Lagos, Nigeria
 City Hall, Singapore, a 1929 national monument in the Central Business District of Singapore
 City Hall, Ljubljana, Slovenia

Other uses
 City Hall (1996 film), a suspense drama film directed by Harold Becker starring Al Pacino and John Cusack
 City Hall (2020 film), a documentary film about the government in Boston, Massachusetts
 The City Hall (TV series), a 2009 South Korean television series
 "City Hall", a song by Tenacious D from their 2001 album Tenacious D
 "City Hall", a song by The Fray from their 2007 album Reason EP
 "City Hall", a song by singer-songwriter Vienna Teng from her 2006 album Dreaming Through the Noise
 "City Hall", a song by Irving Berlin (1932–1936)

See also
 List of city and town halls
 City Hall Station (disambiguation)
 The City Hall Square (disambiguation)

Architectural disambiguation pages